Russula solaris is a species of fungus in the family Russulaceae. It is found in Europe.

See also
List of Russula species

References

solaris
Fungi described in 1924
Fungi of Europe